Imre Ungár (23 January 1909, in Budapest – 22 November 1972, in Budapest) was a Hungarian pianist.

He was blind since the age of three. While a student under István Thomán at the Franz Liszt Academy of Music he won the Competition for Young Talents, beginning a concert career through Hungary. He took part in the II International Chopin Piano Competition, tying with Russian émigré Alexander Uninsky for the 1st prize. Uninsky won the coin flipping.

After World War II, which he spent in the Netherlands, Ungár combined his concert career with teaching at the Liszt Academy.

Sources
 Magyar Életrajzi Lexikon 
 Imre Ungár  Fryderyk Chopin Information Centre

1909 births
1972 deaths
Musicians from Budapest
Hungarian classical pianists
Hungarian Jews
Blind classical musicians
Male classical pianists
Prize-winners of the International Chopin Piano Competition
20th-century classical pianists
20th-century composers
20th-century Hungarian male musicians